This is a list of Bien de Interés Cultural landmarks in the Province of Albacete, Spain.

Albacete Provincial Museum
Alcalá del Júcar
Aqueduct of Albatana
Castle of Almansa
Cathedral of San Juan de Albacete
Cave of Niño
Church of la Asunción (Albacete)
Church of la Asunción (Almansa)
Church of la Asunción (Hellín)
Church of la Asunción (Letur)
Church of la Santísima Trinidad (Alcaraz)
Church of Espíritu Santo
Council House of Villarrobledo
Fair of Albacete
Monumental Square
Palace of Condes de Cirat
Passage of Lodares
Sanctuary of la Virgen de Gracia
Sanctuary of Nuestra Señora de los Remedios
Sanctuary of Santísimo Cristo de la Antigua y Virgen de la Encarnación

References 

 
Albacete